An invasive or alien species is an introduced species to an environment that becomes overpopulated and harms its new environment. Invasive species adversely affect habitats and bioregions, causing ecological, environmental, and/or economic damage. The term can also be used for native species that become harmful to their native environment after human alterations to its food webfor example the purple sea urchin (Strongylocentrotus purpuratus) which has decimated kelp forests along the northern California coast due to overharvesting of its natural predator, the California sea otter (Enhydra lutris). Since the 20th century, invasive species have become a serious economic, social, and environmental threat.

Invasion of long-established ecosystems by organisms is a natural phenomenon, but human-facilitated introductions have greatly increased the rate, scale, and geographic range of invasion. For millennia, humans have served as both accidental and deliberate dispersal agents, beginning with their earliest migrations, accelerating in the age of discovery, and accelerating again with international trade. Notable examples of invasive plant species include the kudzu vine, Andean pampas grass, English ivy, Japanese knotweed, and yellow starthistle. Examples of invasive animals include the New Zealand mud snail, some water fleas (such as Daphnia), feral pig, European rabbit, grey squirrel, domestic cat, carp, and ferret.

Some popular reference sources now name Homo sapiens, especially modern-age humans, as an invasive species, but broad appreciation of human learning capacity and their behavioral potential and plasticity argues against any such fixed categorization.

Terminology

Alien or naturalized species are those species which are not native to an area but established, and those that are a threat to native species and biodiversity are often called invasive species. The term "invasive" is poorly defined and often very subjective. Invasive species may be plants, animals, fungi, and microbes; some also include native species that have invaded human habitats such as farms and landscapes. Some broaden the term to include indigenous or "native" species that have colonized natural areas. The definition of "native" is also sometimes controversial. For example, the ancestors of Equus ferus (modern horses) evolved in North America and radiated to Eurasia before becoming locally extinct. Upon returning to North America in 1493, during their human-assisted migration, it is debatable as to whether they were native or exotic to the continent of their evolutionary ancestors.

While the study of invasive species can be done within many subfields of biology, the majority of research on invasive organisms has been within the field of ecology and geography where the issue of biological invasions is especially important. Much of the study of invasive species has been influenced by Charles Elton's 1958 book The Ecology of Invasion by Animals and Plants which drew upon the limited amount of research done within disparate fields to create a generalized picture of biological invasions. Studies on invasive species remained sparse until the 1990s when research in the field experienced a large amount of growth which continues to this day. This research, which has largely consisted of field observational studies, has disproportionately been concerned with terrestrial plants. The rapid growth of the field has driven a need to standardize the language used to describe invasive species and events. Despite this, little standard terminology exists within the study of invasive species which itself lacks any official designation but is commonly referred to as "invasion ecology" or more generally "invasion biology". This lack of standard terminology is a significant problem, and has largely arisen due to the interdisciplinary nature of the field which borrows terms from numerous disciplines such as agriculture, zoology, and pathology, as well as due to studies on invasive species being commonly performed in isolation of one another. Invasive species often thrive because there are no predators that hunt them in their new locations. Many invasive species are destroying habitats where plants and animals naturally live.

In an attempt to avoid the ambiguous, subjective, and pejorative vocabulary that so often accompanies discussion of invasive species even in scientific papers, Colautti and MacIsaac proposed a new nomenclature system based on biogeography rather than on taxa.

By discarding taxonomy, human health, and economic factors, this model focused only on ecological factors. The model evaluated individual populations rather than entire species. It classified each population based on its success in that environment. This model applied equally to indigenous and to introduced species, and did not automatically categorize successful introductions as harmful.

The USDA's National Invasive Species Information Center defines invasive species very narrowly. According to Executive Order 13112, Invasive species' means an alien species whose introduction does or is likely to cause economic or environmental harm or harm to human health."

Causes
Typically, an introduced species must survive at low population densities before it becomes invasive in a new location. At low population densities, it can be difficult for the introduced species to reproduce and maintain itself in a new location, so a species might reach a location multiple times before it becomes established. Repeated patterns of human movement, such as ships sailing to and from ports or cars driving up and down highways, offer repeated opportunities for establishment (also known as a high propagule pressure). Scientists include ecosystem and species factors among the mechanisms that, when combined, establish invasiveness in a newly introduced species.

Ecosystem-based mechanisms
In ecosystems, the amount of available resources and the extent to which those resources are used by organisms determine the effects of additional species on the ecosystem. In stable ecosystems, equilibrium exists in the use of available resources. These mechanisms describe a situation in which the ecosystem has suffered a disturbance, which changes the fundamental nature of the ecosystem.

When changes such as a forest fire occur, normal succession favors native grasses and forbs. An introduced species that can spread faster than natives can use resources that would have been available to native species, squeezing them out. Nitrogen and phosphorus are often the limiting factors in these situations.

Every species occupies a niche in its native ecosystem; some species fill large and varied roles, while others are highly specialized. Some invading species fill niches that are not used by native species, and they also can create new niches. An example of this type can be found within the Lampropholis delicata species of skink. Invasion is more likely in ecosystems that are similar to the one in which the potential invader evolved.

Ecosystem changes can alter species' distributions. For example, edge effects describe what happens when part of an ecosystem is disturbed as when land is cleared for agriculture. The boundary between remaining undisturbed habitat and the newly cleared land itself forms a distinct habitat, creating new winners and losers and possibly hosting species that would not thrive outside the boundary habitat.

In 1958, Charles S. Elton claimed that ecosystems with higher species diversity were less subject to invasive species because of fewer available niches. Other ecologists later pointed to highly diverse, but heavily invaded ecosystems and argued that ecosystems with high species diversity were more susceptible to invasion.

This debate hinged on the spatial scale at which invasion studies were performed, and the issue of how diversity affects susceptibility remained unresolved as of 2011. Small-scale studies tended to show a negative relationship between diversity and invasion, while large-scale studies tended to show the reverse. The latter result may be a side-effect of invasives' ability to capitalize on increased resource availability and weaker species interactions that are more common when larger samples are considered. However, this spatial scale dependent pattern of the effects of invasion on diversity does not seem to hold true when the invader is a vertebrate.

Island ecosystems may be more prone to invasion because their species face few strong competitors and predators, or because their distance from colonizing species populations makes them more likely to have "open" niches. An example of this phenomenon is the decimation of native bird populations on Guam by the invasive brown tree snake. Conversely, invaded ecosystems may lack the natural competitors and predators that check invasives' growth in their native ecosystems.

On small islands, native birds may have become flightless because of the absence of predators prior to introductions. These birds cannot readily escape the danger brought to them by introduced predators. The tendency of rails in particular to evolve flightless forms on islands has made them vulnerable and has led to the disproportionate number of extinctions in that family.

The islands of Hawaii have many invasive species affecting the islands' native plants and animals. Invasive insects, plants, hoofed animals such as deer, goats and pigs endanger native plants, rosy wolfsnails from the southeastern United States feed on the island's native snails, and plants such as Australian tree fern and Miconia calvescens shade out native plants. Populations of introduced little fire ants in Hawaii can have major negative impacts on animals, crops, and humans. The veiled chameleon and the Jackson's chameleon have a great impact on the ecology of Hawaii.

In New Zealand the first invasive species were the dogs and rats brought by Polynesian settlers around 1300. Cats, brought later by Europeans, have had a devastating effect upon the native birdlife, particularly as many New Zealand birds are flightless. Rabbits, introduced as a food source by sailors in the 1800s, have become a severe nuisance to farmers, notably in the South Island. Common gorse, originally a hedge plant native to Western Europe, was introduced to New Zealand for the same purpose but grows aggressively and threatens to obliterate native plants in much of the country and is hence routinely eradicated. The native forests are heavily impacted by several species of deer from North America and Europe and by the Australian brushtail possum. These exotic species have all thrived in the New Zealand environment.

The colonization of the island of Madagascar has introduced exotic plant and animal species which have significantly altered the island's landscape. This is a result of man-made disturbances to the ecosystems present. The most well-known disturbance is extensive logging. This allows the invasion of non-native species as they establish in the spaces created. Some of the invasive plant species in Madagascar include prickly pear (Opuntia spp.) and silver wattle (Acacia dealbata). The water hyacinth (Eichhornia crassipes), one of the most common invasive plant species in the world, has reached Madagascar over the last few decades. This plant impacts Madagascar financially as a lot of resources are used in attempts to limit the spread. The plant occupies basins of lakes and other water bodies. It forms dense mats with its roots over the surfaces of water and limits light penetration which impacts aquatic organisms. However, this plant is now being used in fertilizers and paper bags and for cleaning up biological waste.

Invaded ecosystems may have experienced disturbance, typically human-induced. Such a disturbance may give invasive species a chance to establish themselves with less competition from natives less able to adapt to a disturbed ecosystem. Primary geomorphological effects of invasive plants are bioconstruction and bioprotection. For example, kudzu (Pueraria montana), a vine native to Asia, was widely introduced in the southeastern United States in the early 20th century to control soil erosion. The primary geomorphological effects of invasive animals are bioturbation, bioerosion, and bioconstruction. For example, invasions of the Chinese mitten crab (Eriocheir sinensis) have resulted in higher bioturbation and bioerosion rates.

Species-based mechanisms

While all species compete to survive, invasive species appear to have specific traits or specific combinations of traits that allow them to outcompete native species. In some cases, the competition is about rates of growth and reproduction. In other cases, species interact with each other more directly.

Researchers disagree about the usefulness of traits as invasiveness markers. One study found that of a list of invasive and noninvasive species, 86% of the invasive species could be identified from the traits alone. Another study found invasive species tended to have only a small subset of the presumed traits and that many similar traits were found in noninvasive species, requiring other explanations. Common invasive species traits include the following:
 Fast growth
 Rapid reproduction
 High dispersal ability
Phenotype plasticity (the ability to alter growth form to suit current conditions)
 Tolerance of a wide range of environmental conditions (Ecological competence)
 Ability to live off of a wide range of food types (generalist)
 Association with humans
 Prior successful invasions

An introduced species might become invasive if it can outcompete native species for resources such as nutrients, light, physical space, water, or food. If these species evolved under great competition or predation, then the new environment may host fewer able competitors, allowing the invader to proliferate quickly. Ecosystems which are being used to their fullest capacity by native species can be modeled as zero-sum systems in which any gain for the invader is a loss for the native. However, such unilateral competitive superiority (and extinction of native species with increased populations of the invader) is not the rule. Invasive species often coexist with native species for an extended time, and gradually, the superior competitive ability of an invasive species becomes apparent as its population grows larger and denser and it adapts to its new location.

An invasive species might be able to use resources that were previously unavailable to native species, such as deep water sources accessed by a long taproot, or an ability to live on previously uninhabited soil types. For example, barbed goatgrass (Aegilops triuncialis) was introduced to California on serpentine soils, which have low water-retention, low nutrient levels, a high magnesium/calcium ratio, and possible heavy metal toxicity. Plant populations on these soils tend to show low density, but goatgrass can form dense stands on these soils and crowd out native species that have adapted poorly to serpentine soils.

Invasive species might alter their environment by releasing chemical compounds, modifying abiotic factors, or affecting the behaviour of herbivores, creating a positive or negative impact on other species. Some species, like Kalanchoe daigremontana, produce allelopathic compounds, that might have an inhibitory effect on competing species, and influence some soil processes like carbon and nitrogen mineralization. Other species like Stapelia gigantea facilitates the recruitment of seedlings of other species in arid environments by providing appropriate microclimatic conditions and preventing herbivory in early stages of development.

Other examples are Centaurea solstitialis (yellow starthistle) and Centaurea diffusa (diffuse knapweed). These Eastern European noxious weeds have spread through the western and West Coast states. Experiments show that 8-hydroxyquinoline, a chemical produced at the root of C. diffusa, has a negative effect only on plants that have not co-evolved with it. Such co-evolved native plants have also evolved defenses. C. diffusa and C. solstitialis do not appear in their native habitats to be overwhelmingly successful competitors. Success or lack of success in one habitat does not necessarily imply success in others. Conversely, examining habitats in which a species is less successful can reveal novel weapons to defeat invasiveness.

Changes in fire regimens are another form of facilitation. Bromus tectorum, originally from Eurasia, is highly fire-adapted. It not only spreads rapidly after burning but also increases the frequency and intensity (heat) of fires by providing large amounts of dry detritus during the fire season in western North America. In areas where it is widespread, it has altered the local fire regimen so much that native plants cannot survive the frequent fires, allowing B. tectorum to further extend and maintain dominance in its introduced range.

Ecological facilitation also occurs where one species physically modifies a habitat in ways that are advantageous to other species. For example, zebra mussels increase habitat complexity on lake floors, providing crevices in which invertebrates live. This increase in complexity, together with the nutrition provided by the waste products of mussel filter-feeding, increases the density and diversity of benthic invertebrate communities.

Studies of invasive species have shown that introduced species have great potential for rapid adaptation. This explains how many introduced species are able to establish and become invasive in new environments. In addition, the rate at which an invasive species can spread can be difficult to ascertain by biologists since population growth occurs geometrically, rather than linearly. When bottlenecks and founder effects cause a great decrease in the population size and may constrict genetic variation, the individuals begin to show additive variance as opposed to epistatic variance. This conversion can actually lead to increased variance in the founding populations which then allows for rapid adaptive evolution. Following invasion events, selection may initially act on the capacity to disperse as well as physiological tolerance to the new stressors in the environment. Adaptation then proceeds to respond to the selective pressures of the new environment. These responses would most likely be due to temperature and climate change, or the presence of native species whether it be predator or prey. Adaptations include changes in morphology, physiology, phenology, and plasticity.

Rapid adaptive evolution in these species leads to offspring that have higher fitness and are better suited for their environment. Intraspecific phenotypic plasticity, pre-adaptation and post-introduction evolution are all major factors in adaptive evolution. Plasticity in populations allows room for changes to better suit the individual in its environment. This is key in adaptive evolution because the main goal is how to best be suited to the ecosystem to which the species has been introduced. The ability to accomplish this as quickly as possible will lead to a population with a very high fitness. Pre-adaptations and evolution after the initial introduction also play a role in the success of the introduced species. If the species has adapted to a similar ecosystem or contains traits that happen to be well suited to the area where it is introduced, it is more likely to fare better in the new environment. This, in addition to evolution that takes place after introduction, all determine if the species will be able to become established in the new ecosystem and if it will reproduce and thrive.

The enemy-release hypothesis states that the process of evolution has led to every ecosystem having an ecological balance. Any one species cannot occupy a majority of the ecosystem due to the presences of competitors, predators, and diseases. Introduced species moved to a novel habitat can become invasive when these controlscompetitors, predators, and diseasesdo not exist in the new ecosystem. The absence of appropriate controls leads to rapid population growth.

Vectors
Non-native species have many vectors, including biogenic vectors, but most invasions are associated with human activity. Natural range extensions are common in many species, but the rate and magnitude of human-mediated extensions in these species tend to be much larger than natural extensions, and humans typically carry specimens greater distances than natural forces.

An early human vector occurred when prehistoric humans introduced the Pacific rat (Rattus exulans) to Polynesia.

Vectors include plants or seeds imported for horticulture. The pet trade moves animals across borders, where they can escape and become invasive. Organisms stow away on transport vehicles. Among professionals in invasion biology, the overwhelming consensus is that incidental human assisted transfer is the main cause of introductionsother than for polar regions. Diseases may also be vectored by invasive insects such as the Asian citrus psyllid and the bacterial disease citrus greening.

The arrival of invasive propagules to a new site is a function of the site's invasibility.

Species have also been introduced intentionally. For example, to feel more "at home," American colonists formed "Acclimation Societies" that repeatedly imported birds that were native to Europe to North America and other distant lands. In 2008, U.S. postal workers in Pennsylvania noticed noises coming from inside a box from Taiwan; the box contained more than two dozen live beetles. Agricultural Research Service entomologists identified them as the rhinoceros beetle, Hercules beetle, and king stag beetle. Because these species were not native to the U.S., they could have threatened native ecosystems. To prevent exotic species from becoming a problem in the U.S., special handling and permits are required when living materials are shipped from foreign countries. USDA programs such as Smuggling Interdiction and Trade Compliance (SITC) attempt to prevent exotic species outbreaks in America. The intentional spread of domesticated plants to other favourable environments has been described as biological globalization.

Many invasive species, once they are dominant in the area, are essential to the ecosystem of that area. If they are removed from the location it could be harmful to that area.

Economics plays a major role in exotic species introduction. High demand for the valuable Chinese mitten crab is one explanation for the possible intentional release of the species in foreign waters.

Within the aquatic environment
The development of maritime trade has rapidly affected the way marine organisms are transported within the ocean. Two ways marine organisms are transported to new environments are hull fouling and ballast water transport. In fact, Molnar et al. 2008 documented the pathways of hundreds of marine invasive species and found that shipping was the dominant mechanism for the transfer of invasive species. 

Many marine organisms have the capacity to attach themselves to vessel hulls. Therefore, these organisms are easily transported from one body of water to another and are a significant risk factor for a biological invasion event. Controlling for vessel hull fouling is voluntary and there are no regulations currently in place to manage hull fouling. However, the governments of California and New Zealand have announced more stringent control for vessel hull fouling within their respective jurisdictions.

The other main vector for the transport of non-native aquatic species is ballast water. Ballast water taken up at sea and released in port by transoceanic vessels is the largest vector for non-native aquatic species invasions. In fact, it is estimated that 10,000 different species, many of which are non-indigenous, are transported via ballast water each day. Many of these species are considered harmful and can negatively affect their new environment. For example, freshwater zebra mussels, native to the Black, Caspian and Azov seas, most likely reached the Great Lakes via ballast water from a transoceanic vessel. Zebra mussels outcompete other native organisms for oxygen and food, such as algae. Although the zebra mussel invasion was first noted in 1988, and a mitigation plan was successfully implemented shortly thereafter, the plan had a serious flaw or loophole, whereby ships loaded with cargo when they reached the Seaway were not tested because their ballast water tanks were empty. However, even in an empty ballast tank, there remains a puddle of water filled with organisms that could be released at the next port (when the tank is filled with water after unloading the cargo, the ship takes on ballast water which mixes with the puddles and then everything including the living organisms in the puddles is discharged at the next port). Current regulations for the Great Lakes rely on 'salinity shock' to kill freshwater organisms left in ballast tanks.

Even though ballast water regulations are in place to protect against potentially invasive species, there exists a loophole for organisms in the 10–50 micron size class. For organisms between 10 and 50 microns, such as certain types of phytoplankton, current regulations allow less than 10 cells per milliliter be present in discharge from treatment systems. The discharge gets released when a ship takes on cargo at a port so the discharged water is not necessarily the same as the receiving body of water. Since many species of phytoplankton are less than 10 microns in size and reproduce asexually, only one cell released into the environment could exponentially grow into many thousands of cells over a short amount of time. This loophole could have detrimental effects to the environment. For example, some species in the genus Pseudo-nitzschia are smaller than 10 microns in width and contain domoic acid, a neurotoxin. If toxic Pseudo-nitzschia spp. are alive in ballast discharge and get released into their "new environment" they could cause domoic acid poisoning in shellfish, marine mammals and birds. Fortunately, human deaths related to domoic acid poisoning have been prevented because of stringent monitoring programs that arose after a domoic acid outbreak in Canada in 1987. Ballast water regulations need to be more rigorous to prevent future ramifications associated with the potential release of toxic and invasive phytoplankton.

Another important factor to consider about marine invasive species is the role of environmental changes associated with climate change, such as an increase in ocean temperature. There have been multiple studies suggesting an increase in ocean temperature will cause range shifts in organisms, which could have detrimental effects on the environment as new species interactions emerge. For example, Hua and Hwang proposed that organisms in a ballast tank of a ship traveling from the temperate zone through tropical waters can experience temperature fluctuations as much as 20 °C. To further examine the effects of temperature on organisms transported on hulls or in ballast water, Lenz et al. (2018) carried out a study where they conducted a double heat stress experiment. Their results suggest that heat challenges organisms face during transport may enhance the stress tolerance of species in their non-native range by selecting for genetically adapted genotypes that will survive a second applied heat stress, such as increased ocean temperature in the founder population. Due to the complexity of climate-change-induced variations, it is difficult to predict the nature of temperature-based success of non-native species in-situ. Since some studies have suggested increased temperature tolerance of "hijackers" on ships' hulls or in ballast water, it is necessary to develop more comprehensive fouling and ballast water management plans in an effort to prevent against future possible invasions as environmental conditions continue to change around the world.

Effects of wildfire and firefighting
Invasive species often exploit disturbances to an ecosystem (wildfires, roads, foot trails) to colonize an area. Large wildfires can sterilize soils, while adding a variety of nutrients. In the resulting free-for-all, formerly entrenched species lose their advantage, leaving more room for invasives. In such circumstances, plants that can regenerate from their roots have an advantage. Non-natives with this ability can benefit from a low intensity fire burn that removes surface vegetation, leaving natives that rely on seeds for propagation to find their niches occupied when their seeds finally sprout.

Wildfires often occur in remote areas, needing fire suppression crews to travel through pristine forest to reach the site. The crews can bring invasive seeds with them. If any of these stowaway seeds become established, a thriving colony of invasives can erupt in as few as six weeks, after which controlling the outbreak can need years of continued attention to prevent further spread. Also, disturbing the soil surface, such as cutting firebreaks, destroys native cover, exposes soil, and can accelerate invasions. In suburban and wildland-urban interface areas, the vegetation clearance and brush removal ordinances of municipalities for defensible space can result in excessive removal of native shrubs and perennials that exposes the soil to more light and less competition for invasive plant species.

Fire suppression vehicles are often major culprits in such outbreaks, as the vehicles are often driven on back roads overgrown with invasive plant species. The undercarriage of the vehicle becomes a prime vessel of transport. In response, on large fires, washing stations "decontaminate" vehicles before engaging in suppression activities. Large wildfires attract firefighters from remote places, further increasing the potential for seed transport.

Adverse effects

Invasive species can affect the invaded habitats and bioregions adversely, causing ecological, environmental, or economic damage.

Ecological

The European Union defines "Invasive Alien Species" as those that are, firstly, outside their natural distribution area, and secondly, threaten biological diversity. Biotic invasion is considered one of the five top drivers for global biodiversity loss and is increasing because of tourism and globalization. This may be particularly true in inadequately regulated fresh water systems, though quarantines and ballast water rules have improved the situation.

Invasive species may drive local native species to extinction via competitive exclusion, niche displacement, or hybridisation with related native species. Therefore, besides their economic ramifications, alien invasions may result in extensive changes in the structure, composition and global distribution of the biota at sites of introduction, leading ultimately to the homogenisation of the world's fauna and flora and the loss of biodiversity. It is difficult to unequivocally attribute extinctions to a species invasion. Although evidence is strong that the recent extinction of about 90 amphibian species can be traced to the chytrid fungus spread by international trade, most scientific research has focused on animal invaders. Concern over the impacts of invasive species on biodiversity typically weighs the actual evidence (either ecological or economic) in relation to the potential risk.

Land clearing and human habitation put significant pressure on local species. Disturbed habitats are prone to invasions that can have adverse effects on local ecosystems, changing ecosystem functions. A species of wetland plant known as aeae in Hawaii (the indigenous Bacopa monnieri) is regarded as a pest species in artificially manipulated water bird refuges because it quickly covers shallow mudflats established for endangered Hawaiian stilt (Himantopus mexicanus knudseni), making these undesirable feeding areas for the birds.

Multiple successive introductions of different non-native species can have interactive effects; the introduction of a second non-native species can enable the first invasive species to flourish. Examples of this are the introductions of the amethyst gem clam (Gemma gemma) and the European green crab (Carcinus maenas). The gem clam was introduced into California's Bodega Harbor from the East Coast of the United States a century ago. It had been found in small quantities in the harbor but had never displaced the native clam species (Nutricola spp.). In the mid-1990s, the introduction of the European green crab, found to prey preferentially on the native clams, resulted in a decline of the native clams and an increase of the introduced clam populations.

Invasive species can change the functions of ecosystems. For example, invasive plants can alter the fire regime (cheatgrass, Bromus tectorum), nutrient cycling (smooth cordgrass Spartina alterniflora), and hydrology (Tamarix) in native ecosystems. Invasive species that are closely related to rare native species have the potential to hybridize with the native species. Harmful effects of hybridization have led to a decline and even extinction of native species. For example, hybridization with introduced cordgrass, Spartina alterniflora, threatens the existence of California cordgrass (Spartina foliosa) in San Francisco Bay. Invasive species cause competition for native species and because of this 400 of the 958 endangered species under the Endangered Species Act are at risk.

The unintentional introduction of forest pest species and plant pathogens can change forest ecology and damage the timber industry. Overall, forest ecosystems in the U.S. are widely invaded by exotic pests, plants, and pathogens.

The Asian long-horned beetle (Anoplophora glabripennis) was first introduced into the U.S. in 1996, and was expected to infect and damage millions of acres of hardwood trees. As of 2005 thirty million dollars had been spent in attempts to eradicate this pest and protect millions of trees in the affected regions. The woolly adelgid has inflicted damage on old-growth spruce, fir and hemlock forests and damages the Christmas tree industry. And the chestnut blight fungus (Cryphonectria parasitica) and Dutch elm disease (Ophiostoma novo-ulmi) are two plant pathogens with serious impacts on these two species and on forest health. Garlic mustard, Alliaria petiolata, is one of the most problematic invasive plant species in eastern North American forests. The characteristics of garlic mustard are slightly different from those of the surrounding native plants, which results in a highly successful species that is altering the composition and function of the native communities it invades. When garlic mustard invades the understory of a forest, it affects the growth rate of tree seedlings, which is likely to alter forest regeneration of impact forest composition in the future.

Native species can be threatened with extinction through the process of genetic pollution. Genetic pollution is unintentional hybridization and introgression, which leads to homogenization or replacement of local genotypes as a result of either a numerical or fitness advantage of the introduced species. Genetic pollution occurs either through introduction or through habitat modification, where previously isolated species are brought into contact with the new genotypes. Invading species have been shown to adapt to their new environments in a remarkably short amount of time. The population size of invading species may remain small for a number of years and then experience an explosion in population, a phenomenon known as "the lag effect".

Hybrids resulting from invasive species interbreeding with native species can incorporate their genotypes into the gene pool over time through introgression. Similarly, in some instances a small invading population can threaten much larger native populations. For example, Spartina alterniflora was introduced in the San Francisco Bay and hybridized with native Spartina foliosa. The higher pollen count and male fitness of the invading species resulted in introgression that threatened the native populations due to lower pollen counts and lower viability of the native species. Reduction in fitness is not always apparent from morphological observations alone. Some degree of gene flow is normal, and preserves constellations of genes and genotypes. An example of this is the interbreeding of migrating coyotes with the red wolf, in areas of eastern North Carolina where the red wolf was reintroduced. The end result was a decrease in stable breeding pairs of red wolf, which may further complicate the social stability of packs and reintroduction efforts.

Environmental 
In South Africa's Cape Town region, analysis demonstrated that the restoration of priority source water sub-catchments through the removal of thirsty alien plant invasions (i.e. Australian acacias, pines and eucalyptus, Australian black wattle, ...) would generate expected annual water gains of 50 billion liters within 5 years compared to the business-as-usual scenario (which is important as Cape Town experiences significant water scarcity).
This is the equivalent to 1/6th of the city's current supply needs. These annual gains will double within 30 years. The catchment restoration is significantly more cost-effective then other water augmentation solutions (1/10 the unit cost of alternative options). A water fund has been established, and these exotic species are being eradicated.

Human health 
Not only have invasive species caused ecological damage and economical losses, but they can also affect human health. With the alteration in ecosystem functionality (due to homogenization of biota communities), invasive species have resulted in negative effects on human well-being, which includes reduced resource availability, unrestrained spread of human diseases, recreational and educational activities, and tourism. With regard to human health, alien species have resulted in allergies and skin damage to arise. Other similar diseases that invasive species have caused include human immunodeficiency virus (HIV), monkey pox, and severe acute respiratory syndrome (SARS).

Invasive species and accompanying control efforts can have long term public health implications. For instance, pesticides applied to treat a particular pest species could pollute soil and surface water. Encroachment of humans into previously remote ecosystems has exposed exotic diseases such as HIV to the wider population. Introduced birds (e.g. pigeons), rodents and insects (e.g. mosquito, flea, louse and tsetse fly pests) can serve as vectors and reservoirs of human afflictions. Throughout recorded history, epidemics of human diseases, such as malaria, yellow fever, typhus, and bubonic plague, spread via these vectors. A recent example of an introduced disease is the spread of the West Nile virus, which killed humans, birds, mammals, and reptiles. The introduced Chinese mitten crabs are carriers of Asian lung fluke. Waterborne disease agents, such as cholera bacteria (Vibrio cholerae), and causative agents of harmful algal blooms are often transported via ballast water.

Economic
Globally, 1.4 trillion dollars are spent every year in managing and controlling invasive species. Some invaders can negatively affect the economy of the local area.

Invasive species can become financial burdens for many countries. Due to ecological degradation caused by invasive species, this can alter the functionality and reduce the services that ecosystems provide. Additional costs are also expected to control the spread of biological invasion, to mitigate further impacts, and to restore ecosystems. For example, the cost of damage caused by 79 invasive species between 1906 and 1991 in the United States has been estimated at US$120 billion. In China, invasive species have reduced the country's gross domestic product (GDP) by 1.36% per year. Management of biological invasion can also be costly. In Australia, the expense to monitor, control, manage, and research invasive weed species was approximately AU$116.4 million per year, with costs only directed to central and local government. In some situations, invasive species may have benefits, such as economic returns. For instance, invasive trees can be logged for commercial forestry. However, in most cases, the economic returns are far less than the cost caused by biological invasion.

United States
For example, in the Great Lakes Region the sea lamprey is an invasive species that acts as a predator. In its original habitat, the sea lamprey used co-evolution to act as a parasite without killing the host organism. However, in the Great Lakes Region, this co-evolutionary link is absent, so the sea lamprey acts as a predator and can consume up to 40 pounds of fish in its 12–18 month feeding period. Sea lampreys prey on all types of large fish such as lake trout and salmon. The sea lampreys' destructive effects on large fish negatively affect the fishing industry and have helped cause the collapse of the population of some species.

Economic costs from invasive species can be separated into direct costs through production loss in agriculture and forestry, and management costs. Estimated damage and control cost of invasive species in the U.S. alone amount to more than $138 billion annually. Economic losses can also occur through loss of recreational and tourism revenues. When economic costs of invasions are calculated as production loss and management costs, they are low because they do not consider environmental damage; if monetary values were assigned to the extinction of species, loss in biodiversity, and loss of ecosystem services, costs from impacts of invasive species would drastically increase. The following examples from different sectors of the economy demonstrate the impact of biological invasions.

It is often argued that the key to reducing the costs of invasive species damage and management is early detection and rapid response, meaning that incurring an initial cost of searching for and finding an invasive species and quickly controlling it, while the population is small, is less expensive than managing the invasive population when it is widespread and already causing damage. However, an intense search for the invader is only important to reduce costs in cases where the invasive species is (1) not frequently reintroduced into the managed area and (2) cost effective to search for and find.

Weeds reduce yield in agriculture, though they may provide essential nutrients. Some deep-rooted weeds can "mine" nutrients (see dynamic accumulator) from the subsoil and deposit them on the topsoil, while others provide habitat for beneficial insects or provide foods for pest species. Many weed species are accidental introductions that accompany seeds and imported plant material. Many introduced weeds in pastures compete with native forage plants, threaten young cattle (e.g., leafy spurge, Euphorbia virgata) or are unpalatable because of thorns and spines (e.g., yellow starthistle). Forage loss from invasive weeds on pastures amounts to nearly US$1 billion in the U.S. alone. A decline in pollinator services and loss of fruit production has been caused by honey bees infected by the invasive varroa mite. Introduced rats (Rattus rattus and R. norvegicus) have become serious pests on farms, destroying stored grains. The introduction of leaf miner flies (Agromyzidae), including the American serpentine leaf miner (Liriomyza trifolii), to California has also caused losses in California's floriculture industry, as the larvae of these invasive species feed on ornamental plants.

Invasive plant pathogens and insect vectors for plant diseases can also suppress agricultural yields and nursery stock. Citrus greening is a bacterial disease vectored by the invasive Asian citrus psyllid (ACP). Because of the impacts of this disease on citrus crops, citrus is under quarantine and highly regulated in areas where ACP has been found.

Invasive species can impact outdoor recreation, such as fishing, hunting, hiking, wildlife viewing, and water-based activities. They can damage a wide array of environmental services that are important to recreation, including, but not limited to, water quality and quantity, plant and animal diversity, and species abundance. Eiswerth states, "very little research has been performed to estimate the corresponding economic losses at spatial scales such as regions, states, and watersheds". Eurasian watermilfoil (Myriophyllum spicatum) in parts of the US, fill lakes with plants complicating fishing and boating. The very loud call of the introduced common coqui depresses real estate values in affected neighborhoods of Hawaii. The orb-weaving spider Zygiella x-notata, which is invasive to California, disrupts garden work with their large webs.

Europe 
The overall economic cost of invasive alien species in Europe between 1960 and 2020 has been estimated at around US$140 billion (including potential costs that may or may not have actually materialised) or US$78 billion (only including observed costs known to have materialised). These estimates are very conservative. Models based on these data suggest a true annual cost of around US$140 billion in 2020.

 is one of the most invaded countries in Europe, with an estimate of more than 3,000 alien species. The impacts of invasive alien species on the economy has been wide-ranging, from management costs, to loss of crops, to infrastructure damage. The overall economic cost of invasions to Italy between 1990 and 2020 was estimated at US$819.76 million (EUR€704.78 million). However, only 15 recorded species have more reliably estimated costs, hence the actual cost may be much larger than the aforementioned sum.

 has an estimated minimum of 2,750 introduced and invasive alien species. Renault et al. (2021) obtained 1,583 cost records for 98 invasive alien species and found that they caused a conservative total cost between US$1.2 billion and 11.5 billion over the period 1993–2018. This study also extrapolated costs for species invading France, but for which costs were reported only in other countries but not in France, which yielded an additional cost ranging from US$151 million to $3.03 billion. Damage costs were nearly eight times higher than management expenditure. Insects, and in particular the Asian tiger mosquito Aedes albopictus and the yellow fever mosquito Ae. aegypti, totalled very high economic costs, followed by non-graminoid terrestrial flowering and aquatic plants (Ambrosia artemisiifolia, Ludwigia sp. and Lagarosiphon major). Over 90% of alien species currently recorded in France had no costs reported in the literature, resulting in high biases in taxonomic, regional and activity sector coverages. However, no reports does not mean that there are no negative consequences and thus no costs.

Favorable effects

Chris D. Thomas argues that most introduced species are neutral or beneficial with respect to other species but this is a minority opinion. The scientific community generally considers their effects on biodiversity to be negative.

Invasive species have the potential to provide a suitable habitat or food source for other organisms. In areas where a native has become extinct or reached a point that it cannot be restored, non-native species can fill their role. Examples of this are:
 The Tamarisk, a non-native woody plant, and the Southwestern Willow Flycatcher, an endangered bird. 75% of Southwestern Willow Flycatchers were found to nest in these plants and their success was the same as the flycatchers that had nested in native plants. The removal of Tamarisk would be detrimental to Southwestern Willow Flycatcher, as their native nesting sites are unable to be restored.
 The California clapper rail (Rallus longirostris obsoletus), had grown partial to the new hybrid grass of Spartina alterniflora and Spartina foliosa (invasive). The new grass grew more densely than the local version and did not die back during the winter, providing better cover and nesting habitat for the secretive bird. During the 1990s, as the hybrid spread, the rail population had soared.
This has encouraged growth of some aquatic plants, which in turn have become nurseries for fish such as the yellow perch. The zebra mussel also constitutes a food source for fish species such as the smallmouth bass and the previously endangered lake sturgeon, with demonstrable effects on population sizes. Lake Erie is now reportedly the world's premier smallmouth bass fishery. Migrating ducks have also started to make use of the mussels as a food source.
Saltwater crocodiles have lived in Australia for millions of years, but by the 1960's and 1970's were in danger of extinction. Wild pigs, introduced by European settlers, became a staple in their diet. The native estuarine crocodile population has since recovered in large part thanks to these invasive feral swine.

The second way that non-native species can be beneficial is that they act as catalysts for restoration. This is because the presence of non-native species increases the heterogeneity and biodiversity in an ecosystem. This increase in heterogeneity can create microclimates in sparse and eroded ecosystems, which then promotes the growth and reestablishment of native species. In Kenya, guava has real potential as a tool in the restoration of tropical forest. Studies of isolated guava trees in farmland showed that they were extremely attractive to a wide range of fruit-eating birds. In the course of visiting them, birds dropped seeds beneath the guavas, many of them from trees in nearby fragments of rainforest, and many of these seeds germinated and grew into young trees. Guavas establish easily on degraded land, and each tree is potentially the nucleus of a patch of regenerating rainforest. Of course, most seedlings that grow beneath guavas are just more guavas, but guava is an early-successional tree that soon dies out when overtopped by bigger trees, nor does it actively invade primary forest. Invasive alien trees can also be useful for restoring native forest. In Puerto Rico, native pioneer trees could cope with natural disturbances such as drought, hurricanes, floods and landslides, but are mostly unable to colonise land that has undergone deforestation, extended agricultural use and eventual abandonment. In these sites, low-diversity pioneer communities of invasive trees develop, but over time native trees invade. Alien pioneers may dominate for 30 to 40 years but the eventual outcome, after 60 to 80 years, is a diverse mixture of native and alien species, but with a majority of native species. In the absence of the initial alien colonists, abandoned agricultural land tends to become pasture and remain that way almost indefinitely.

The last benefit of non-native species is that they provided ecosystem services. Furthermore, non-native species can function as biocontrol agents to limit the effects of invasive species, such as the use of non-native species to control agricultural pests. Asian oysters, for example, filter water pollutants better than native oysters to Chesapeake Bay. A study by the Johns Hopkins School of Public Health found the Asian oyster could significantly benefit the bay's deteriorating water quality. Additionally, some species have invaded an area so long ago that they have found their own beneficial niche in the environment, a term referred to as naturalisation. For example, the bee Lasioglossum leucozonium, shown by population genetic analysis to be an invasive species in North America, has become an important pollinator of caneberry (Rubus spp.) as well as cucurbit, apple trees, and blueberry bushes. The checkerspot butterfly had an advantage to any female that laid her eggs on ribwort plantain, an invasive plant. The plantain leaves remained green long enough for the caterpillars to survive during dry summers, which seemed to be getting a little drier with the first signs of climate change. In contrast, the native plants they used to eat shriveled up and most of the caterpillars starved or desiccated. With this difference in survival, the butterflies started to evolve a liking for laying their eggs on plantains: the proportion of female butterflies content to lay their eggs on this plant rose from under a third in 1984 to three-quarters in 1987. A few years later, the switch was complete. The federally endangered Taylor's checkerspot (Euphydryas editha taylori, a subspecies of Edith's checkerspot, whose historical habitats have been lost) is so reliant on it that conservationists are actively planting plantains out into the wild. To provide a supply of butterflies, prisoners at the Mission Creek Corrections Center for Women in Washington state breed checkerspots in a greenhouse so that they can be released into these new habitats. Odd as it might seem, actively encouraging an alien plant (increasing gains) is helping to conserve a much-loved native insect (reducing losses).

Some invasions offer potential commercial benefits. For instance, silver carp and common carp can be harvested for human food and exported to markets already familiar with the product, or processed into pet foods, or mink feed. Water hyacinth can be turned into fuel by methane digesters, and other invasive plants can also be harvested and utilized as a source of bioenergy.
But elsewhere, most of the time, the tens of thousands of introduced species usually either swiftly die out or settle down and become model eco-citizens, pollinating crops, spreading seeds, controlling predators, and providing food and habitat for native species. They rarely eliminate natives. Rather than reducing biodiversity, the novel new worlds that result are usually richer in species than what went before.

Control, eradication, and study

Human behavioural potential and plasticity in species-environment interactions create possibilities for remediating adverse effects of species invasions. The public is interested in learning more about invasive species, and is most motivated by invasive species that are impacting their local area/community. 
The control of alien species populations is a complex but important task in the strategy for the conservation of biodiversity in natural ecosystems, since invaders may cause considerable economic and ecological damage. One of the most promising methods for controlling alien species is genetic.

Cargo inspection and quarantine
The original motivation was to protect against agricultural pests while still allowing the export of agricultural products. In 1994 the first set of global standards were agreed to, including the Agreement on the Application of Sanitary and Phytosanitary Measures (SPS Agreement). These are overseen by the World Trade Organization. The International Maritime Organization oversees the International Convention for the Control and Management of Ships' Ballast Water and Sediments (the Ballast Water Management Convention). Although primarily targeted at other, more general environmental concerns, the Convention on Biological Diversity does specify some steps that its members should take to control invasive species. The CBD is the most significant international agreement on the environmental consequences of invasive species because most such measures are voluntary and unspecific.

Slowing spread
Firefighters are increasingly becoming responsible for decontamination of their own equipment, public water equipment, and private water equipment, due to the risk of aquatic invasive species transfer. In the United States this is especially a concern for wildland firefighters because quagga and zebra mussel invasion and wildfires happen to be co-occurring in the American West.

Reestablishing species

The field of island restoration has developed as a field of conservation biology and ecological restoration, a large part of which deals with the eradication of invasive species. A 2019 study suggests that if eradications of invasive animals were conducted on just 169 islands the survival prospects of 9.4% of the Earth's most highly threatened terrestrial insular vertebrates would be improved.

Invasive vertebrate eradication on islands was found to align with the majority of United Nations Sustainable Development Goals (specifically Goal 15) and numerous associated targets such as marine and terrestrial biodiversity conservation, promotion of local and global partnerships, economic development, climate change mitigation, human health and sanitation and sustainable production and consumption.

Rodents were carried to South Georgia, an island in the southern Atlantic Ocean with no permanent inhabitants, in the 18th century by sealing and whaling ships. They soon wrought havoc on the island's bird population, eating eggs and attacking chicks. In 2018, the South Georgia Island was declared free of invasive rodents after a multi-year extermination effort. Post-extermination, bird populations have rebounded, including populations of the South Georgia pipit and South Georgia pintail, two species found only on the island.

Problematic exotic disease introductions in the past century or so include the chestnut blight which has almost eliminated the American chestnut tree from its forest habitat. Responses to increase the population of the American chestnut include creating blight-resistant trees that can be reintroduced. This displays both the negative and the positive aspects of introduced species.

Problems can also arise like in the case of the tangled ecology of San Francisco Bay who also tripped as ecological restorers. In the mid-twentieth century, engineers drained many of the bay's marshes and mud banks for building projects. But attitudes changed. Conservationists became concerned about the loss of natural habitat, and from the 1970s, engineers spent more millions of dollars on plugging up their drains to restore lost mudflats, salt marshes, and other wetlands. As part of this program, the Army Corps of Engineers began planting rewetted marshes with a cordgrass native to the eastern United States Spartina alterniflora. This new grass began to interbreed with its close relative, the local California cordgrass (Spartina foliosa). The result was a new hybrid grass that colonized much more aggressively than either of its forebears. It spread to areas no one had intended, blanketing previously open mudflats, clogging channels, getting in the way of oyster farmers, and—worst of all, for many—spoiling million-dollar views and damaging the value of upscale waterfront properties. So a decade ago, authorities launched a multimillion-dollar project to rid the bay of both the alien from the east and the hybrid. But that went wrong too. It turned out that one of the bay's most totemic and endangered birds, the chicken-sized and largely flightless California clapper rail (Rallus longirostris obsoletus), had grown partial to the new hybrid grass. The grass grew more densely than the local version and did not die back during the winter, providing better cover and nesting habitat for the secretive bird. During the 1990s, as the hybrid spread, the rail population had soared. But after 2004, as the eradication got underway, the bird's numbers crashed. There was no mistaking the cause. In time and space, the bird population declined following the eradication of the alien grass.

Taxon substitution

Non-native species can be introduced to fill an ecological engineering role that previously was performed by a native species now extinct. The procedure is known as taxon substitution.

On many islands, tortoise extinction has resulted in dysfunctional ecosystems with respect to seed dispersal and herbivory. On the offshore islets of Mauritius, tortoises now extinct had served as the keystone herbivores. Introduction of the non-indigenous Aldabra giant tortoises on two islets in 2000 and 2007 has begun to restore ecological equilibrium. The introduced tortoises are dispersing seeds of several native plants and are selectively grazing invasive plant species. Grazing and browsing are expected to replace ongoing intensive manual weeding, and the introduced tortoises are already breeding.

Invasivorism

Invasive species are flora and fauna whose introduction into a habitat disrupts the native eco-system. In response, Invasivorism is a movement that explores the idea of eating invasive species in order to control, reduce, or eliminate their populations. Chefs from around the world have begun seeking out and using invasive species as alternative ingredients.

In 2005 Chef Bun Lai of Miya's Sushi in New Haven, Connecticut, created the first menu dedicated to the idea of using invasive species, during which time half the menu's invasive species offerings were conceptual because invasive species were not yet commercially available. Today, Miya's offers a plethora of invasive species such as Chesapeake blue catfish, Florida lionfish, Kentucky silver carp, Georgia cannonball jellyfish, and invasive edible plants such as Japanese knotweed and Autumn olive.

Joe Roman, a Harvard and University of Vermont conservation biologist who is the recipient of the Rachel Carson Environmental award, is the editor and chief of Eat The Invaders, a website dedicated to encouraging people to eat invasive species as part of a solution to the problem.

Skeptics point out that once a foreign species has entrenched itself in a new place—such as the Indo-Pacific lionfish that has now virtually taken over the waters of the Western Atlantic, Caribbean and Gulf of Mexico—eradication is almost impossible. Critics argue that encouraging consumption might have the unintended effect of spreading harmful species even more widely.

Proponents of invasivorism argue that humans have the ability to eat away any species that it has an appetite for, pointing to the many animals which humans have been able to hunt to extinction—such as the Caribbean monk seal, and the passenger pigeon. Proponents of invasivorism also point to the success that Jamaica has had in significantly decreasing the population of lionfish by encouraging the consumption of the fish.

In recent years, organizations including Reef Environmental Educational Foundation and the Institute for Applied Ecology, among others, have published cookbooks and recipes that include invasive species as ingredients.

Pesticides
Pesticides are commonly used to control and eradicate invasives. Herbicides used against invasive plants include fungal herbicides. Although the effective population size of an introduced population is bottlenecked, some genetic variation has been known to provide invasive plants with resistance against these fungal bioherbicides. Meyer et al. 2010 finds invasive populations of Bromus tectorum with resistance to Ustilago bullata used as a biocontrol, and Bruckart et al. 2017 find the same in Microstegium vimineum subject to Bipolaris microstegii and B. drechsleri. This is not solely a character of invasive plant genetics  Burdon et al. 1995 show this is normal for wild plants in their study of the native weed Linum marginale and its fungal pathogen Melampsora lini. They further show that some of this resistance is due to irregular germination leading to persistence in the seed bank. MacDonald et al. 2011 and Fowler et al. 2013 find that crops also have another disadvantage over any uncontrolled plant  wild native or invasive  namely their greater uptake of nutrients. Crops are deliberately bred to increase nutrient intake to enable their increased product output. Any pathogen will find a less attractive environment in or on the invasive plant than a crop, and MacDonald finds fertilizer is often irrelevant to that invasive ⇔ crop nutrient differential.

Predicting future invasive species 
Predicting future invasive species is a topic of priority for many researchers. This trend has been motivated by the extreme adverse effects and persistent nature of invasive species. In other words, because invaders cause significant damage (see "Adverse effects" section above) and are nearly impossible to completely eradicate once they have established in a new environment, there is a consensus that invasions are best managed by predicting which species have a high likelihood of causing adverse effects and preventing the introduction of those species into new environments.

Predicting invasive plants 
Accurately predicting the impacts of non-native plants can be an especially effective management option because most introductions of non-native plant species are intentional. Therefore, because humans have control over the majority of these introductions, accurate knowledge about which species are likely to cause adverse effects could be used to outlaw the import and export of problematic plants.

It is important to note that the vast majority (estimates range between 66–90%) of non-native plants do not have negative impacts when relocated to new environments. Furthermore, these harmless non-native plants make up a significant component of the horticulture industry (an industry that did $13.8 billion in sales in the United States in 2019). Therefore, most scientists agree that banning the relocation of all non-native plants would be unnecessarily harsh, in addition to being unrealistic. This further emphasizes the need to predict which species will become invasive and only regulate those plants.

Weed risk assessments 
Weed risk assessments are commonly-used tools to predict the chances of a specific plant species having negative effects in a specific new environment (sometimes called "Pest risk analyses", especially when used for more taxa than only plants). Many weed risk assessments take the form of a standardized questionnaire. In these cases, a phytosanitary expert will assign the focal species a score for each question based on the risk posed by the plant in the new environment. At the end of the weed risk assessment, the scores from all the questions are summed, and the total score is associated with a management action (often "allow introduction" for low risk species, "evaluate further" for species that are between low risk and high risk, and "prevent introduction" for high risk species).

Weed risk assessments commonly use information about the physiology, life history traits, native ranges, and phylogenetic relationships of each species that is evaluated. While certain components within these categories have previously been associated with invasive plants, whether they can be used to make meaningful predictions of invasive species remains a topic of debate.

See also
 Lists of invasive species
 Aquatic invasive species regulations in Michigan
 Climate change and invasive species
 Genetic modification of native predator species
 Agricultural robot
 Ecologically based invasive plant management
 Garden refugee
 Hemerochory
 Invasion genetics
 Naturalized species
 Colonisation (biology)

References

Attribution
This article incorporates CC-BY-3.0 text from the reference

Citations

Sources

Further reading
 Removing Threat from Invasive Species with Genetic Engineering
 
 Should We Fight Invasive Species With Genetic Engineering

External links
 Invasive Plant Terminology
 North American Invasive Species Network, a consortium that uses a coordinated network to advance science-based understanding and enhance management of non-native, invasive species.
 Great Britain Non-native Species Secretariat (NNNS) website
 Invasive Species Compendium, an encyclopaedic resource that draws together scientific information on all aspects of invasive species
 Invasive Species, National Invasive Species Information Center, United States National Agricultural Library
Invasive Species Specialist Group – Global Invasive Species Database
 Pacific Island Ecosystems at Risk project (PIER)
 invadingspecies.com of the Ontario Ministry of Natural Resources and Ontario Federation of Anglers and Hunters
Aquatic invasive species in Ireland, Inland Fisheries Ireland
Invasive alien species in Belgium Belgian Forum on Invasive Species (BFIS)
"Invasive species" from the Global Legal Information Network Subject Term Index

 Invasive species
Environmental conservation
Environmental terminology
Habitat
Pest control
Forest pathology